Alkalihalobacillus berkeleyi is a bacterium from the genus of Alkalihalobacillus which has been isolated from a sea urchin (Strongylocentrotus intermedius).

References

Bacillaceae
Bacteria described in 2012